The Sangha River, a tributary of the Congo River, is located in Central Africa.

Geography
The Sangha River is formed at the confluence of the Mambéré River and the Kadéï River at Nola in the western Central African Republic. The Sangha flows along the border of Cameroon, with the Central African Republic, and then the Republic of Congo. It joins the Congo River at 

The tributaries of the Sangha River include the Ngoko River (Dja river). Its river mouth and confluence with the Sangha is at Ouésso, in the Republic of the Congo..

Ecology
The Sangha River is a Freshwater ecoregion of Africa. Its wetlands in the Central African Republic, Cameroon and Congo are protected Ramsar sites.

References

External links 

 Water Resources eAtlas.org: Map of the Sangha River basin

 
Rivers of Cameroon
Rivers of the Republic of the Congo
Rivers of the Central African Republic
Freshwater ecoregions of Africa
Ecoregions of Cameroon
Ecoregions of the Democratic Republic of the Congo
Ecoregions of the Republic of the Congo
International rivers of Africa
Cameroon–Republic of the Congo border
Cameroon–Central African Republic border
Mambéré-Kadéï
Sangha Department (Republic of the Congo)
Ramsar sites in Cameroon
Ramsar sites in the Central African Republic
Ramsar sites in the Republic of the Congo
Tributaries of the Congo River
East Region (Cameroon)
Border rivers